Reeve Oliver is the debut album by the San Diego, California pop rock band Reeve Oliver, released in 2004 by The Militia Group. It was awarded "best rock album" at the 2005 San Diego Music Awards. A music video was filmed for the lead single "I Want Burns" and the band toured with Yellowcard and played on the Warped Tour in support of the album.

Track listing
All songs written by Sean O'Donnell
"I Want Burns"
"I Don't Want to Know!"
"Young and Dumb"
"Your Own Private Ice Age"
"On the Floor"
"Yer Motion"
"Until Someone Loves You"
"Inhale, Exhale"
"Reevenge"
"An Offer She Can't Refuse"
"Sizzle Digitz"

Personnel
Sean O'Donnell - vocals, guitar, piano
Otisserie Bartimus (Otis Bartholameu) - bass
Brad Davis - drums, congas
Jeff Livingston - organ and piano on "Young and Dumb"
Lenny Beh - violin on "An Offer She Can't Refuse"

Album information
Record label: The Militia Group
All songs written by Sean O'Donnell
Produced and engineered by Sean O'Donnell at Golden Track Studios in Escondido, California with additional production by O.
Mixed by Mark Trombino at Extasy Studios in south Los Angeles, California with assistance by Justin Smith
Mastered by John Golden at John Golden Mastering
Design by O and Earl Grey Design
Photography by Peter King

References

Reeve Oliver albums
2004 debut albums